Paul Alphonsus McSweeney (April 3, 1867 – August 12, 1951) was a professional baseball player who played second base in the Major Leagues for the 1891 St. Louis Browns.

McSweeney also worked as a soccer referee at the 1904 Summer Olympics in St. Louis.

He died in his home town of St. Louis, Missouri in 1951 of Colorectal cancer.

References

External links

1867 births
1951 deaths
Major League Baseball second basemen
Baseball players from St. Louis
St. Louis Browns (AA) players
19th-century baseball players
American soccer referees